Nawang Dorje Sherpa, is a Nepalese mountaineer and mountain guide, best known for the first ascent of Dhaulagiri, as a member of Helvetic-Austrian expedition and many ascents in the mountains of the Himalaya Range.

Mountaineering
 1960 – Dhaulagiri, with  Kurt Diemberger, Peter Diener, Nima Dorje, Ernst Forrer, Albin Schelbert
 1995 - Cho Oyu, September 29 with Tomonori Harada, Shigeki Imoto, Kunga Sherpa.
 1996 - Everest, SE Ridge with Pete Schoening, Anatoli Boukreev et al, May 1–13. Death of Scott Fischer.
 2000 - Everest, May 19, North Col - North Ridge
 2004 - 3rd ascent to Everest with international expedition through South Col Route
 2007 - 4th ascent to Everest, with a French expedition.

Its reported that he has also climbed Annapurna IV, Island Peak and Pisang Peak.

See also
Eight-thousander

References

Nepalese mountain climbers
Living people
Year of birth missing (living people)